David or Dave Myers may refer to:

 David Myers (Indiana judge) (1859–1955), Associate Justice of the Indiana Supreme Court
 Dave Myers (American football) (1906–1997), American football player for Staten Island Stapletons and Brooklyn Dodges
 David Myers (cinematographer) (1914–2004), American photographer and cinematographer
 Dave Myers (fl. 1950s–1980s), bass player for American band The Aces
 David Myers (Oklahoma politician) (1938–2011), American politician, member of the Oklahoma Senate
 David Myers (psychologist) (born 1942), American psychologist
 Dave Myers (presenter) (born 1957), British presenter of cookery programmes, one of the Hairy Bikers
 Dave Myers (baseball) (born 1959), American baseball coach
 David N. Myers (born 1960), American historian
 David Myers (Mississippi politician) (born 1961), American politician, member of the Mississippi House of Representatives
 David Myers (rugby league) (1971–2008), English rugby league footballer
 David Myers (Australian footballer) (born 1989), Australian rules footballer
 David Myers (police officer) (fl. 1980s–2010s), commander in the San Diego County Sheriff's Department
 David Myers (American chef) (fl. 2000s–2010s), American chef and restaurateur

See also
David Meyers (disambiguation)
David Meyer (disambiguation)